Martic Forge is an unincorporated community in Martic Township in Lancaster County, Pennsylvania, United States. Martic Forge is located at the intersection of Pennsylvania Route 324 and River Road just east of the Pequea Creek.

References

Unincorporated communities in Lancaster County, Pennsylvania
Unincorporated communities in Pennsylvania